The Dirty Tricks are a Canadian rock band formed in Montreal, Quebec, Canada in 2003.

(Not to be confused with "Dirty Tricks", a rock band that recorded for Polydor Records 1975–1977)

They toured with Malajube (Dare to Care Records), The Sainte Catherines (Fat Wreck Chords) and shared the stage with established bands such as NOFX, Against Me!, The (International) Noise Conspiracy and many more.

Their first single was the theme song of the skateboarding TV program called The Under Attack Show, aired on Musique Plus and Razer channel (now known as MTV2).  Two other songs were used on Fast Cars and Superstars: The Gillette Young Guns Celebrity Race on ABC.

The Dirty Tricks have 4 albums out, won a MIMI award in 2008 and were nominated twice for a GAMIQ award. Considered as one of the best underground rock band coming out of Montreal.

Discography

Singles

Albums

See also

Music of Canada
Canadian rock
List of bands from Canada

References

External links
 The Dirty Tricks on Myspace
 The Dirty Tricks at CBC Radio 3

Musical groups established in 2003
Musical groups disestablished in 2010
Musical groups from Montreal
Canadian indie rock groups
2003 establishments in Quebec
2010 disestablishments in Quebec